The Royal Dutch Billiards Federation (KNBB) was founded in 1911 to coordinate, within the Netherlands, billiards, pool and snooker. The union is affiliated with the Union Mondiale de Billard , Confédération Européenne de Billard and NOC * NSF . The Head Office is located in the Blokhoeve district of Nieuwegein

External links 
 Official website (in Dutch)

Cue sports governing bodies
Cue sports in the Netherlands
Organisations based in Utrecht (province)
Sport in Nieuwegein